Ellendale is a city in Steele County, Minnesota, United States. The population was 691 at the 2010 census.

History
Ellendale was platted in 1900, and named for Ellen Dale Ives, the wife of a railroad official. A post office has been in operation at Ellendale since 1901.

Geography

Minnesota State Highway 30 and Interstate 35 are two of the main routes in the community.

Demographics

2010 census
As of the census of 2010, there were 691 people, 296 households, and 190 families residing in the city. The racial makeup of the city was 98.6% White, 0.3% Native American, 0.1% Asian, 0.9% from other races, and 0.1% from two or more races. Hispanic or Latino of any race were 2.5% of the population.

There were 296 households, of which 31.1% had children under the age of 18 living with them, 49.3% were married couples living together, 10.1% had a female householder with no husband present, 4.7% had a male householder with no wife present, and 35.8% were non-families. 31.1% of all households were made up of individuals, and 13.8% had someone living alone who was 65 years of age or older. The average household size was 2.33 and the average family size was 2.89.

The median age in the city was 39.6 years. 24.5% of residents were under the age of 18; 8.2% were between the ages of 18 and 24; 24.5% were from 25 to 44; 26.6% were from 45 to 64; and 16.4% were 65 years of age or older. The gender makeup of the city was 50.2% male and 49.8% female.

2000 census
As of the census of 2000, there were 590 people, 252 households, and 166 families residing in the city. The racial makeup of the city was 98.98% White, 0.34% Asian, 0.34% from other races, and 0.34% from two or more races. Hispanic or Latino of any race were 1.36% of the population.

There were 252 households, out of which 30.6% had children under the age of 18 living with them, 53.6% were married couples living together, 7.9% had a female householder with no husband present, and 34.1% were non-families. 30.2% of all households were made up of individuals, and 18.7% had someone living alone who was 65 years of age or older.  The average household size was 2.34 and the average family size was 2.90.

In the city, the population was spread out, with 24.7% under the age of 18, 6.6% from 18 to 24, 27.3% from 25 to 44, 20.8% from 45 to 64, and 20.5% who were 65 years of age or older.  The median age was 40 years. For every 100 females, there were 92.2 males.  For every 100 females age 18 and over, there were 100.0 males.

The median income for a household in the city was $37,750, and the median income for a family was $50,139. Males had a median income of $31,023 versus $24,306 for females. The per capita income for the city was $19,750.  About 11.4% of families and 10.1% of the population were below the poverty line, including 13.4% of those under age 18 and 13.0% of those age 65 or over.

References

Cities in Minnesota
Cities in Steele County, Minnesota
Populated places established in 1901
1901 establishments in Minnesota